Kjeller Flyfabrikk (Kjeller Aircraft Factory) a contraction of Kjeller Flyvemaskinsfabrik (Kjeller Flying machine factory), was a Norwegian manufacturer of military aircraft. It was formally established in 1915, but was active from 1912. The factory was owned by the Norwegian government under the management of the Norwegian Army Air Service. It was also known as the Hærens Flyfabrikk.

It mainly built foreign types of aircraft under license, but also developed several types.

Aircraft produced at Kjeller Flyfabrikk 

Aircraft manufacturers of Norway
Companies based in Skedsmo
Manufacturing companies established in 1912
Manufacturing companies disestablished in 1952
1952 disestablishments in Norway
Norwegian companies established in 1912